Lubna Aslam is a Pakistani actress. She has appeared in a number of television serials and advertisements. She has worked with directors such as Babar Javed, Mehreen Jabbar, and Haissam Hussain. She has mostly appeared as a liberal mother. Mostly she has done the role of a mother except for Meri Zaat Zarra-e-Benishan (2010). Her works include Parchaiyan (1976)Daam  (2010), Roshan Sitara (2012), Ishq Gumshuda (2010) Zid (2014), Thora Sa Aasman (2016), Sehra Main Safar (2016) and Mann Mayal (2016).

Filmography

Films

Selected Television

References

External links

21st-century Pakistani actresses
Living people
Year of birth missing (living people)
People from Karachi